This is a list of all cricketers who have captained the Nepal in an official international match. This includes One Day Internationals, Twenty20 Internationals and ICC Trophy games. The table is correct as of their last ODI game which was played on January 26, 2019.

One Day International

Nepal played their first ODI on August 1, 2018.

Twenty20 International

Nepal played their first T20 on March 14, 2014.

ICC Trophy

Nepal debuted in the ICC Trophy in the 2001 tournament.

References

External links
Cricinfo

Nepal
Cricket captains
Nepal in international cricket